Keeney Creek or sometimes Keeney Branch is a stream in southwest Ray County of northwest Missouri. It is a tributary of the Fishing River.

The stream flows south past Elkhorn and parallel to Missouri Route N. Approximately six miles south of its origin the stream passes under Missouri Route 210 and the communities of Albany and Orrick. The confluence is approximately one quarter mile north of the Fishing River confluence with the Missouri River and within the Missouri River floodplain.

The stream was named for a family who lived adjacent to the stream in Orrick Township.

References

Rivers of Ray County, Missouri
Rivers of Missouri